Abdelkader Chadi (born 12 December 1986) is an Algerian boxer who won the All-African title 2007 at featherweight and 2015 at junior welter. He also qualified for the 2008, 2012 and 2016 Summer Olympics.

Career
Chadi beat Roberto Adjaho in the semis and Alaa Shili in the final of the Featherweight competition at the 2007 All-Africa Games. In 2008 he qualified for the Beijing Olympics by beating Shili again. He skipped the final against Mahdi Ouatine. He had weight problems and competed at lightweight in the months before the Olympics.

At the 2008 Summer Olympics, he beat Sailom Adi in the last 16, before losing to Yakup Kılıç in the last 8.

At the 2012 Summer Olympics he competed at lightweight, losing to Fatih Keleş in the first round.

In the 2016 Summer Olympics he lost to Joedison Teixeira of Brazil in the first round of the light welterweight competition.

References

External links
 
 All Africa at amateur-boxing.strefa.pl
 Qualifier at amateur-boxing.strefa.pl
 
 

1986 births
Living people
Featherweight boxers
Lightweight boxers
Light-welterweight boxers
Boxers at the 2008 Summer Olympics
Boxers at the 2012 Summer Olympics
Boxers at the 2016 Summer Olympics
Olympic boxers of Algeria
Sportspeople from Sétif
Algerian male boxers
African Games gold medalists for Algeria
African Games medalists in boxing
Mediterranean Games gold medalists for Algeria
Mediterranean Games medalists in boxing
Competitors at the 2007 All-Africa Games
Competitors at the 2015 African Games
Competitors at the 2013 Mediterranean Games
21st-century Algerian people